Meelis Veilberg (born 11 March 1961) is an Estonian athle. He was born in Paide.

He started training when he was 17, coached by Leonhard Soom. His later coaches were Arvo Orupõld and Uno Källe. He focused on long-distance running. He is a multiple-time Estonian champion in various running events.

Records:
 1500 m: 3.54,0 (1983)
 5000 m: 14.22,1 (1983)
 10 000 m: 30.01,95 (1993)

References

External links

Living people
1961 births
Estonian male long-distance runners
Sportspeople from Paide